Bartosz Konitz (born 30 December 1984) is a Polish handball player. He plays for Wilhelmshavener HV and the Polish national team.

He competed at the 2016 European Men's Handball Championship.

References

1984 births
Living people
Polish male handball players
Wisła Płock (handball) players
People from Oborniki County
Sportspeople from Greater Poland Voivodeship